John Yarde-Buller, 1st Baron Churston (12 April 1799 – 4 September 1871) was a British Conservative politician.

Origins
Born John Buller-Yarde-Buller, he was the eldest son of Sir Francis Buller-Yarde-Buller, 2nd Baronet (1767–1833) by his wife Elizabeth Holliday, only daughter and sole heiress of John Holliday of Dilhorne Hall in the parish of Dilhorne, Staffordshire.

Career
In 1833 he inherited his father's baronetcy and entered Parliament two years later as Member of Parliament for South Devon. He held the seat for almost twenty-four years and on his retirement in 1858, was raised to the peerage as Baron Churston, of Churston Ferrers and Lupton, Co. Devon. In 1860, he changed the family name to Yarde-Buller. He served as Lieutenant-Colonel of the South Devon Militia and became its commanding officer in 1852 when the post of Colonel of the Regiment was abolished. His son the Hon John Buller Yarde-Buller also served in the regiment and succeeded him in command.

Marriages and children
Lord Churston married twice:
Firstly on 24 January 1823 to Elizabeth Wilson-Patten (d.1857), a daughter of Thomas Wilson-Patten of Bank Hall in Lancashire, and a sister of John Wilson-Patten, 1st Baron Winmarleigh, by whom he had two children:
Hon. John Yarde-Buller (1823–1867), a soldier, who predeceased his father;
Hon. Bertha Yarde-Buller (died 1872), who married Sir Massey Lopes, Bt.
Secondly in 1861 he married Caroline Newman (d.1866), 2nd daughter of Sir Robert Newman, 1st Baronet (1776–1848) of Mamhead House in Devon.

Death and succession
Lord Churston died in 1871 and his titles passed to his eldest grandson, John Yarde-Buller, 2nd Baron Churston.

Notes

References

External links
 

1799 births
1871 deaths
1
Yarde-Buller, John
Yarde-Buller, John
Yarde-Buller, John
Yarde-Buller, John
Yarde-Buller, John
Yarde-Buller, John
UK MPs who were granted peerages
Yarde-Buller, John
John
Members of the Parliament of the United Kingdom for South Devon
British Militia officers
Devon Militia officers
Peers of the United Kingdom created by Queen Victoria